Judith Godrèche (born 23 March 1972) is a French actress and author. She has appeared in more than 30 films.

Early life
Godrèche was born in the 17th arrondissement of Paris. Her father is a psychoanalyst, and her mother a child therapist. Her parents separated when she was eight years old. Her father is Jewish; his parents were Holocaust survivors from Poland and Russia who changed their surname from Goldreich. After being discovered for her first role at the age of 14, Godrèche left school and moved away from her parents to begin her acting career. In 1990, at the age of 17, she was in a relationship with director Benoît Jacquot, 25 years her senior, who was directing her in The Disenchanted.

Career 
Her early work included commercial modeling for a Japanese chocolate maker, as well as a teen magazine. Her first film appearance was as Claudia Cardinale's daughter in L'été prochain. At 14, she obtained her first major role, in Jacquot's Les mendiants, with Dominique Sanda.

In 1989, Godrèche starred in Jacques Doillon's La fille de 15 ans with Melvil Poupaud, which brought her fame. The following year, she turned to a full-time career in film. In 1990 she was nominated for the César Award for Most Promising Actress for her performance in Jacquot's La désenchantée.

In 1991, she was a member of the jury at the 41st Berlin International Film Festival.

In 1994 her novel Point de côté was published in France by Broché Publishers to good reviews.

Godrèche was not well known to American audiences until Patrice Leconte's Ridicule was released in 1996. The film introduced her to Americans in the role of Mathilde de Bellegarde. In 1998 she starred with Leonardo DiCaprio and Jeremy Irons in The Man in the Iron Mask.

Godrèche was nominated for a 2002 César Award for Best Supporting Actress for her performance in the surprise European hit, L'Auberge espagnole.

Her first record inspired from the film Toutes les filles pleurent was released by Because Music.

In 2012, she began playing the continuing character of Claudette Von Jurgens in season 3 of Royal Pains.

Godrèche's performance as Charlotte in the film The Overnight has led to her being called a "breakout" star of 2015. She is also starring in an upcoming HBO comedy about a French actress who moves to Los Angeles.

Personal life 
Godrèche had a long-term relationship since 1990 with Benoît Jacquot who was 25 years her senior. She was briefly married to Philippe Michel, an architect, in 1996. She was later married to comedian Dany Boon from 1998 to 2002. Together they have a son, Noé, born 4 September 1999. In 2004, she began a relationship with actor and director Maurice Barthélémy, who is the father of her daughter, Tess, born 19 April 2005. The couple split in 2014.

Godrèche has considered converting to Judaism as an adult, which she attributed to her close relationship with her paternal grandparents.

Filmography

Actress

Director and writer 
 Toutes les filles pleurent (2010)

References

External links 

 
 
 

1972 births
Living people
Actresses from Paris
French film actresses
French women film directors
French women screenwriters
French screenwriters
French women novelists
French people of Polish descent
French people of Jewish descent